The In Between is a 2022 American science fiction romance film directed by Arie Posin, written by Marc Klein, and starring Joey King and Kyle Allen. The film was released on February 11, 2022 on Paramount+ and on April 8, 2022 on Netflix.

Plot
The opening scene is a traffic accident. Two young people lie on the road, the girl barely moving, the boy, motionless. Tessa wakes up in the hospital.

In a flashback set 182 days before, Tessa spends the morning taking photos in the coastal town, wandering into the local theater to watch a classic French film. Skylar, the other person at the movie, offers to translate. He is a true romantic, he and Tessa have very different views.

In a flashback set 102 days before, Tessa is encouraged to apply to the RISD for her photography skills. Later, while shooting a rowing meet, she finally finds Skylar again. They both obviously had been searching for each other. They spend the day together, and she shows him the world through her eyes. At the Empyrean, an abandoned honeymooners hotel he teaches her to waltz and they kiss. He tells her he’ll be back at the end of the month to stay for the summer.

In the present, Tessa is back at school, and is reminded of the RISD deadline. Later, going home, she throws out her developing materials. Her adoptive dad reminds her that her mother never stuck to anything. Dreaming of Skylar, she wakes up to see her Robert Doisneau print of Le baiser de l'hôtel de ville. 
Flashback: July 4. After the fireworks, she shows him her darkroom, portfolio and opens up about her mother flaking out, forcing her into the foster care system. They go out on a boat during the day, he shows her how to row, he declares his love and they make love on the shore.

Tessa tells her friend Shannon about The In Between, the concept of a window of time in which someone recently deceased needs to have a final contact before moving on. Sitting the SAT, weirdly Skylar moves her hand on her answer sheet to draw what seems to be a non-sensical scribble. Then their song, ‘Never tear us apart’ comes up simultaneously on everyone’s silenced mobiles.

Flashback: 11 days before the accident. Skylar angers Tessa when he puts a photo she gifted him in a photo exhibit to show her talent. Her inability to express her feelings comes up. He wants her to realize they could have a future and she continues to hold back. Photographing her adoptive mother, she’s advised to try to admit her feelings out loud.

Shannon helps Tessa try to channel Skylar after reading several books. First they try with a planchette, scrying, and instrumental trans-communication Electronic voice phenomenon which, unbeknownst to them, works on the TV. Getting in her adoptive mother’s car, the built-in GPS shows her the same route she had scribbled on her SAT sheet. So, she blows off returning the car, following the route, arriving to the In Between author Doris she met in the hospital. She suggests Tessa seek him where they had their strongest moments. 
Flashback: 5 days before the accident. Tessa discovers Skylar has decided to go to Oregon to support his father for the year, leaving her on the East coast. She takes it as a sign, as she finally has applied to RISD and was about to express her love, and she breaks it off.

After buying special photography equipment, Shannon drives Tessa to the places she and Skylar had most closely connected, hoping to catch his image/connect. Finally they do connect at The Empyrean, but not completely, and he shatters a mirror trying to reach her. The police catch up with her there, traced through her mobile. At home, her adoptive parents are on top of her, she collapses, and in the hospital she’s told her heart needs to be repaired the next day. Shannon sneaks her out, with Skylar’s help (he manipulates some electronics, distracting the nurses), who then guides them to the site of the accident.

In a flashback to the night of the accident, Shannon convinces Tessa to catch Skylar before he leaves. The timelines overlap. As paramedics attend Tessa’s collapsed body, reunited with Skylar briefly, they are in Paris, in black and white, and mimic the Doisneau print Le baiser… They are back at a house on the beach, and she hears from far off her adoptive mom calling her back. Tearfully, she reminds him that ´love never dies’, deciding to go back to live.

In a mid-credits scene, Tessa and Skylar are wandering around the beach drawing stick figures on sand.

Cast

Production
On February 24, 2021 it was announced that Arie Posin will direct a film for Paramount+. On the same day, the film was announced together with Paranormal Activity: Next of Kin and an upcoming Pet Sematary film, with Joey King revealed as part of the cast. In April 2021, April Parker Jones, Celeste O'Connor, Donna Biscoe, Kyle Allen, John Ortiz and Kim Dickens was revealed as part of the cast of the film.

Release
The film was released on February 11, 2022 on Paramount+. Netflix distributed the film outside the United States releasing on April 8, 2022.

Reception 
The film received mixed reviews from critics. The review aggregator website Rotten Tomatoes reported an approval rating of 64%, with an average score of 5.80/10, based on 11 reviews.

References

External links

2022 films
2022 romantic drama films
2022 science fiction films
2020s American films
2020s English-language films
2020s teen romance films
American science fiction romance films
American teen romance films
Films about photographers
Films about road accidents and incidents
Paramount Pictures films
Paramount Players films
Paramount+ original films